The 1894 Chicago Athletic Association football team represented the Chicago Athletic Association, or C. A. A., during the 1894 college football season. In Harry Cornish's second year with the athletic club, CAA compiled a  7–3–1 record, and outscored their opponents 129 to 118.  The team played its home games at CAA Field, located on the corner of 35th Street and Wentworth Avenue, in Chicago.

Schedule

Second team schedule

The CAA also operated a 2nd team, which played one known contest against the Chicago Maroons, and lost 20–0.

References

Chicago Athletic Association
Chicago Athletic Association football seasons
Chicago Athletic Association football